The initial design development for the PowerTech V6 and V8 engine family was done by American Motors Corporation (AMC) and debuted in 1998 with credit to Chrysler. This was the first new V8 engine for Chrysler since the 1960s. The companion V6 was basically the V8 with two fewer cylinders, another concept that originated at AMC before the company joined Chrysler. These new engines had nothing in common with the Chrysler A engine V8s, nor the Jeep 4.0 L "PowerTech" I6 engine. 

A 4.7 L V8 came first, available in the Jeep Grand Cherokee, and a 3.7 L V6 version debuted in 2002 for the Jeep Liberty. The PowerTech V6 and V8 were direct replacements for Chrysler's LA family in the early 2000s, and were also used in the Dodge Ram and started in the 2000 Dodge Durango. They were not used in any cars, but were reserved for truck and SUV use. They are also known as Next Generation Magnum in Dodge applications.

The PowerTech V6 and V8 engines were produced at the Mack Avenue Engine Complex in Detroit, Michigan. E85 compatible versions of some PowerTech engines were developed and used in numerous Chrysler vehicles. On April 9, 2013, the last 4.7 L engine was built; ending 15 years of production with over 3 million units built.

4.7
The 4.7-liter version was the first of this family, appearing in the 1999 Jeep Grand Cherokee. It has a cast iron block and aluminum heads with two valves per cylinder. It uses chain-driven Single overhead camshafts, one in each head. The 4.7 L V8 is available with four speed and five speed automatic transmissions and a 5 speed manual transmission.

The PowerTech was on the Ward's 10 Best Engines list for 1999.

1999–2009 Jeep Grand Cherokee
2000–2007 Dodge Dakota
2000–2009 Dodge Durango
2002–2007 Dodge Ram 1500
2006–2009 Jeep Commander
2007–2009 Chrysler Aspen
2006–2007 Mitsubishi Raider

4.7 HO

This engine was discontinued after the 2008 model year, though the non high output 4.7L V8 engine continued to be available in all vehicles.

Applications:
2002–2004 Jeep Grand Cherokee
2007–2008 Jeep Grand Cherokee
2007–2008 Dodge Dakota
2007–2008 Dodge Ram 1500/Ram 1500

2008 Revisions
The 2008 4.7 also features other upgrades including a more aggressive camshaft profile, a  throttle body, and an improved intake manifold with shorter runners. See Allpar's page on the latest 4.7 L.

3.7 EKG

The EKG  is a 3.7 L V6 version built in Detroit, Michigan. It displaces . The bore and stroke measure . It is a 90° V engine like the V8, with SOHC 2-valve heads. It utilizes a counter-rotating balance shaft mounted between the cylinder banks to deal with vibration problems of the 90-degree V6 design, as well as use a 30-degree split pin crankshaft to fire the cylinders every 120 degrees. It has a cast iron engine block and aluminum SOHC cylinder heads. It uses Sequential fuel injection, has roller followers, and features fracture-split forged powder metal connecting rods and an assembled reinforced plastic intake manifold.

The Chrysler 3.7 PowerTech engine used in the 2007 - 2012 Jeep Liberty KK used a wasted spark ignition system that uses one ignition coil to fire two cylinders.

Applications
2002–2010 Dodge Ram 1500
2011-2012 Ram 1500
2004–2011 Dodge Dakota
2004–2009 Dodge Durango
2007–2011 Dodge Nitro
2002–2012 Jeep Liberty
2005–2010 Jeep Grand Cherokee
2006–2010 Jeep Commander
2006–2010 Mitsubishi Raider
2002      Dodge M80

References

External links

Allpar's page on the 3.7L
Allpar's page on the latest 4.7L
3.7L V6 PowerTech Engine: Specs, Problems, Reliability

PowerTech
V6 engines
V8 engines
Gasoline engines by model